Ede Szomjas (6 September 1914 – 8 March 1987) was a Hungarian sports shooter. He competed in the trap event at the 1960 Summer Olympics.

References

1914 births
1987 deaths
Hungarian male sport shooters
Olympic shooters of Hungary
Shooters at the 1960 Summer Olympics
Sport shooters from Budapest